Love Story is a 1970 novel by American writer Erich Segal. Segal wrote a screenplay that was subsequently approved for production by Paramount Pictures. Paramount requested that Segal adapt the story into a novel as part of the film's marketing campaign. The novel was released on February 14, 1970 (Valentine's Day), along with segments of the story which appeared in The Ladies' Home Journal. Love Story became the top-selling work of fiction for the duration of 1970 in the United States and was translated into more than 20 languages. The novel stayed on The New York Times Best Seller list for 41 weeks, and peaked at number one. The film was released on December 16, 1970. 

In 1977, a sequel Oliver's Story, was published, and made into a film in 1978.

Summary 

Love Story is the tale of two college students who fall in love: Oliver Barrett IV, a jock and heir apparent to his father's business empire, and Jennifer Cavilleri, the quick-witted daughter of a Rhode Island baker. Oliver (Ollie) is at Harvard preparing to take over the family business, while Jennifer (Jenny) is a music major at Radcliffe College and planning to study in Paris. Although, divided by class, Oliver and Jenny are immediately attracted to each other and begin dating.

Upon graduation from college, the two decide to marry, against the wishes of Oliver's father, who promptly severs all ties with his son. Without financial support from Oliver's family, the couple struggles to pay Oliver's tuition at Harvard Law School. Jenny begins working as a private school teacher. After graduating third in his class, Oliver gets several job offers and takes up a position at a respectable New York law firm. The couple move to New York City, excited to spend more time together, rather than working and studying. The pair decide to have a child. After Jenny fails to conceive, they consult a medical specialist, who after repeated tests, informs Oliver that Jenny has terminal leukemia.

As instructed by their doctor, Oliver attempts to live a normal life without telling Jenny of her condition. Jenny suspects something is wrong, confronts the doctor, and discovers the truth. With their days together numbered, Oliver is desperate and seeks financial relief from his father, but lies about why he needs it. From her hospital bed, Jenny speaks with her father about funeral arrangements, and then asks for Oliver. She tells him to avoid blaming himself, and asks him to hold her tightly before she dies. When Oliver's father realizes that Jenny is ill and that his son borrowed the money for her, he immediately sets out for New York to reconcile with the couple. By the time he reaches the hospital, Jenny has died. Mr. Barrett apologizes to his son, who replies with something Jenny had once told him: "Love means never having to say you're sorry..." and breaks down in his arms.

Sources 
New York magazine in 1971 stated that Jenny resembled the "myopic, athletic, brisk princess" Brenda Patimkin in Philip Roth's Goodbye, Columbus.

It is sometimes said that Al Gore falsely claimed that the plot is based on his life at Harvard. In fact, Al Gore mentioned correctly, that he had read that the characters were based on him and his wife. In 1997, Segal confirmed Gore's account, explaining that he had been inaccurately quoted in the Nashville Tennessean and that "only the emotional family baggage of the romantic hero was inspired by a young Al Gore. But it was Gore's Harvard roommate, Tommy Lee Jones, who inspired the half of the character that was a sensitive stud, a macho athlete with the heart of a poet". Erich Segal had met both Jones and Gore at Harvard in 1968, when he was there on sabbatical.

David Johnston, who became Governor General of Canada from 2010 to 2017, was the basis for the character Davey, an ice hockey team captain. Johnston had been a Harvard Crimson varsity hockey captain and a friend and jogging partner of Segal.

Reception

The novel was an instant commercial success, despite scathing reviews. It was nominated for a National Book Award, but it was withdrawn when the judges threatened to resign. William Styron, the head judge for fiction that year, called it "a banal book which simply doesn't qualify as literature" and suggested that even by being nominated it would have "demeaned" all the other novels under consideration.

Influences
A number of Indian films were based on the novel:
Manjal kumkumam, a 1973 Tamil film
Ankhiyon Ke Jharokhon Se, a 1978 Hindi film
Madanolsavam, a 1978 Malayalam film
Sanam Teri Kasam, is a 2016 Hindi film based on this novel.
In addition, Mujhse Dosti Karoge!, a 2002 Hindi film, mentions the novel a few times.

See also 
 1970 in literature
 Love Story (1970 film)
 Love Story (1973 TV series)
 Ankhiyon Ke Jharokhon Se (1978 film)
 Mera Naam hay Muhabbat (1979 Film Pakistan)
 Love (2008 film)
Sanam Teri Kasam (2016 film)

References

External links 
 

1970 American novels
American novels adapted into films
American romance novels
Harper & Row books
Love stories
1970 debut novels
Novels set in Harvard University
Novels set in New York City
Interclass romance in fiction
Novels about cancer